Broadford Track is the popular name of Broadford State Motorcycle Sports Complex in Victoria, Australia.

It is primarily used for motorcycle racing, but is also used for car testing, although car racing is restricted to motorcycle-engined vehicles due to planning restrictions and the lack of a track circuit licence.

The State Motorcycle Complex also has a  Motorcycle speedway track. The track has hosted the Victorian Individual Speedway Championship on three occasions: 2002/03 won by Travis McGowan, 2005/06 won by Cameron Woodward and 2009/10 won by Ty Proctor. On the infield of the speedway is a  junior speedway track. The complex also includes a Motocross track.

In 2014 Motorcycle Victoria leased part of the unused land in the complex to Calibre Sports Inc., a handgun target shooting club who have set up a new range.

References

External links
 Official Broadford Track website
 Champions Ride Day, organises Broadford Track rides
 Formula Ford Experience Australia, regularly runs drive events at this venue

Motorsport venues in Victoria (Australia)
Sports venues in Victoria (Australia)